The Parumala Seminary is a Syrian Christian religious school located in Parumala, Thiruvalla, Pathanamthitta District, Kerala, India. It was established by Pulikkottil Joseph Mar Dionysious II and served as the seat of Metropolitan Geevarghese Mar Gregorios of Niranam diocese, the first Indian to be elevated as a saint by the Malankara Orthodox Syrian Church and the Syrian Orthodox Church. The administrative annexe in India of the UK, Europe and Africa Malankara Orthodox Diocese, whose headquarters is in London, is in Parumala Seminary.

References

Christian seminaries and theological colleges in India
Schools in Pathanamthitta district
Educational institutions in India with year of establishment missing